The Mockers were a New Zealand pop band formed in Wellington in 1979 by Andrew Fagan. Fagan was the only ever-present of the band's line-up whose initial members were mostly drawn from Fagan's Rongotai College classmates. Their songs include "One Black Friday" and "Forever Tuesday Morning". The Mockers' style drew on punk and new wave influences from the UK and performances centered on Fagan's flamboyant stage presence. Other band members included Chas Mannell (drums) Gary Curtis (keyboards, vocals), Steve Thorpe (drums), Dale Monaghan (guitar), Dean Heazlewood, Brett Adams, Geoff Hayden, Tim Wedde, Murray Costello, Chas Mannell, Gordon Costello, Brendan Fitzgerald, Baz Caitcheon and Paul Lightfoot (guitar).

The group broke up in 1988, after which Fagan embarked on a solo career.

Discography

Albums

Notes

Singles

Awards

|-
| 1984
| Swear It's True
| 1984 New Zealand Music Awards - Album of the Year
|  
|-
| 1984
| Andrew Fagan
| 1984 New Zealand Music Awards - Top Male Vocalist
|  
|-
| 1984
| The Mockers
| 1984 New Zealand Music Awards - Top Group
|  
|-
| 1985
| "Forever Tuesday Morning"
| 1985 New Zealand Music Awards - Single of the Year
|  
|-
| 1985
| Andrew Fagan
| 1985 New Zealand Music Awards - Best Male Vocalist
|  
|-
| 1985
| The Mockers
| 1985 New Zealand Music Awards - Best Group
|  
|-
| 1985
| Glyn Tucker "Forever Tuesday Morning"
| 1985 New Zealand Music Awards - Best Producer
|  
|-
|}

References

External links
AudioCulture profile

APRA Award winners
Musical groups established in 1979
New Zealand pop music groups